The 2001 Individual Speedway European Championship

Qualification

Qualifying Round:
June 4, 2001
 Abensberg

Semi-Final A:
July 29, 2001
 Lviv

Semi-Final B:
August 12, 2001
 Lendava

Final
August 26, 2001
 Heusden Zolder

See also

2001
Euro I